Bikash Roychoudhury is an Indian politician from AITC. In May 2021, he was elected as the member of the West Bengal Legislative Assembly from Suri.

Career
Roychoudhury is from Bolpur, Birbhum district. His father's name is Abinash Chandra Roychoudhury. He passed B.Com from Bolpur College in 1973. He contested in 2021 West Bengal Legislative Assembly election from Suri Vidhan Sabha and won the seat on 2 May 2021.

References

Year of birth missing (living people)
21st-century Indian politicians
People from Birbhum district
Trinamool Congress politicians from West Bengal
Trinamool Congress politicians
West Bengal MLAs 2021–2026
Living people